Farol de Fontes Pereira de Melo (also: farol da ponta de Tumbo) is a lighthouse at the northeastern point of the island of Santo Antão in northwestern Cape Verde. It is situated on the headland Ponta de Tumbo, 2 km east of Janela, 6 km southeast of Pombas and 15 km northeast of Porto Novo. The lighthouse was named after Fontes Pereira de Melo, prime minister of Portugal for several times between 1871 and 1886. It is a white octagonal masonry tower, 16 meters high.

Demolition 
October 2017 photos on Google Maps show the lighthouse is no longer there, with only underground parts of the interior and the stairwell still visible.

Rebuilt 

We were there in February 2019. A beautiful (new?) lighthouse is there. It is also visible on Google maps now.

See also
List of lighthouses in Cape Verde

References

External links

Old post

Fontes Pereira de Melo
Paul, Cape Verde
Lighthouses completed in 1884
1880s establishments in Cape Verde

sv:Ponta de Tumba